Telestes ukliva is a species of ray-finned fish in the family Cyprinidae.
Endemic to the Cetina river in Croatia and reported as extinct in the 1990s, it was rediscovered in 1997. Earlier authors misidentified T. ukliva as the alien Telestes muticellus and erroneously considered T. ukliva to be extinct. 
Its natural habitat is rivers.
It is threatened by habitat loss.

References

Telestes
Fish described in 1843
Taxonomy articles created by Polbot